Peltigera scabrosa is a lichen which has a circumpolar distribution. Its common name is scabby pelt.

It is a known host species to the lichenicolous fungus Nectriopsis lecanodes.

References

scabrosa
Lichen species
Lichens described in 1861
Lichens of North America
Lichens of Canada
Fungi without expected TNC conservation status
Taxa named by Theodor Magnus Fries